Fangzhicheng station, is a station of Line 1, Line 6 and Line 9 of  Xi'an Metro. It started operations on 15 September 2013.

References

Railway stations in Shaanxi
Railway stations in China opened in 2013
Xi'an Metro stations